Sirimathi Mary Fernando (born 10 May 1932 - died 3 September 1992 as සිරිමතී රසාදරී) [Sinhala]), popularly as Sirimathi Rasadari, was an actress in Sri Lankan cinema, as well as a renowned Kathak dancer. Considered as the first in Sri Lanka to mastered the art of dancing, acting, singing and writing at the same time, she is the pioneer to establish United Ceylon Fan Club in 1957.

Personal life
She was born on 10 May 1932 in Nainamadama, Dummalawarama, Wennappuwa as third of the family. She had two sisters and five brothers. She was educated at Dummaladeniya Roman Catholic School. She can write, speak and read Hindi as well as can speak Tamil and English.

She was married to Rathna Dissanayake, who was a lecturer at Giragama Aesthetic University. Rasadari also served as a visiting lecturer at the University of the Visual and Performing Arts.

Rasadari died on 3 September 1992 at the age of 60.

Career
In 1939 while at the school, she contested for a singing competition conducted for the All Island Health Week. She won the first place from the North Western Province. With the intentions to be a dancer, she learned Kathakali dancing from Shantha Kalayathana in Meeepura under Shanthi Viraj in 1967, 
Bharatha and Manipuri dances by Shanthi Kumar Seneviratne and Kandyan dancing under Heenbaba Dharmasiri for eight years. She was the first Sri Lankan graduate of Bharath Kathak Dance and started a music company called Sangeetha Kendra in 1977. The specialty of this institution was that it has been approved as the Colombo Center for the passage of all music examinations in Bhatkanda since 1987.

She also became a singer at Radio Ceylon and sang on HMV and Odien gramophone trades as the supporting singer for Premanath Morais and Sunil Premadasa. She has sung the song A Maha Veera Budu Piya with Premanath Morais which has become a popular song. She also gained popularity as a singer by singing the song Paana Paththu Nokeruwata for the movie Daiwayogaya with Mohideen Baig.

Even though she was selected for the film Prema Tharagaya, she refused to act due to a scene with partial nudity. Her maiden cinema appearance came through film Puduma Leli under the supervision of Hugo Fernando at the age of 15. Then she acted in the film Dosthara where she went India for the film shooting. The she acted many popular films such as Sri 296, Surathali, Nalangana, Sansare and Samaje Sathuro.

Then she acted along with Rukmani Devi in te popular film Daiwayogaya as "Sugala". She acted as Ananda Jayaratne's girlfriend in the song Siriyame Sara, which was H.R. Jothipala's first film background song. The highlight of her acting career was the role of "Maggie" in the movie Parasathumal. During the period as a lecturer, she published a book on Indian dance Narthana Kala in Sinhala, which was first such in Sri Lanka.

Filmography

References

External links

Sri Lankan film actresses
1932 births
1992 deaths
20th-century Sri Lankan actresses
21st-century Sri Lankan actresses
Sri Lankan stage actresses
Sinhalese actresses